The Centrist Democratic Party may refer to:

Centrist Democratic Party (Rwanda)
Centrist Democratic Party of the Philippines